The Pom Pom Girls (also known as Palisades High) is a 1976 American film directed by Joseph Ruben. The screenplay was written by Ruben and based on a story by him and Robert J. Rosenthal. The movie was shot on location at Chaminade High School in Los Angeles. The Pom Pom Girls is a teensploitation film, female relationships and cheerleaders in locations that are "any town" American. Disobedient teens in a date movie with romance and sex, plenty of outdoor activities, stunts that are coordinated for actors and actresses, and indoor activities for a new audience.

Plot

A football player falls for a girl who is dating another guy, while another cannot figure out which girl he likes.

The big game against rival Hardin High School is looming while a full scale prank war is underway.

Production

The modest profits of the prior exploitation/teensploitation film The Cheerleaders (1975) inspired The Pom Pom Girls writers with cheerleader themes and scenes. Easy Rider had an influence on the film, the huge success of that film had film makers like the scriptwriters Robert Rosenthal and Joseph Ruben, who is the director, include the theme of the value of freedom. Many shots and automobiles were included, drive-in restaurant, "suicide chicken" race, many scenes of nostalgia that was incorporated from the present day. Even a tagline was borrowed form the ‘50s picture', the exploitation flick The Rebel without a Cause (1955). The tagline "How can anyone ever forget the girls who really turned us on?", is a promotional line and used in the films cover art, and is to express nostalgia.

Cast
 Robert Carradine as Johnnie
 Jennifer Ashley as Laurie
 Michael Mullins as Jesse
 Lisa Reeves as Sally
 Bill Adler as Duane
 James Gammon as Coach
 Susan Player as Su Ann
 Cheryl Smith (Credited as Rainbeaux Smith) as Roxanne
 Diane Lee Hart as Judy
 Sondra Lowell as Miss Pritchett

Reception
The film earned $4.3 million in rentals during its initial release.

DVD

This film has been issued on Too Cool For School: 12 Movie Collection from Mill Creek Entertainment September 29, 2009 and on The Starlite Drive-In Theater: (The Pom Pom Girls / The Van ) from BCI / Eclipse September 26, 2006

References

External links 
 
 
 
The Pom Pom Girls at Trailers from Hell

1976 films
American coming-of-age comedy films
American teen comedy films
Crown International Pictures films
1970s English-language films
American independent films
Films directed by Joseph Ruben
1976 comedy films
Teensploitation
1976 independent films
1970s American films